Federica Foghetti (born October 14, 1968 in Rome) is an Italian modern pentathlete. She placed 32nd in the women's individual event at the 2004 Summer Olympics.

References

External links
 

1968 births
Living people
Italian female modern pentathletes
Olympic modern pentathletes of Italy
Modern pentathletes at the 2004 Summer Olympics
20th-century Italian women
21st-century Italian women